Gold Beach was one of the Allied landing points in France during the Battle of Normandy.

Gold Beach or Golden Beach may also refer to:

 Gold Beach, Oregon, United States
 Golden Beach, Florida, United States
 Golden Beach, Greece
 Golden Beach, Maryland, United States
 Golden Beach, Chennai, India

See also
 Gold Coast (disambiguation)